The 2011 Kilkenny Senior Hurling Championship was the 117th staging of the Kilkenny Senior Hurling Championship since its establishment by the Kilkenny County Board in 1887. The Championship began on 17 September 2011 and ended on 30 October 2011.

O’Loughlin Gaels were the defending champions, however they were defeated in the semi final by Ballyhale Shamrocks. 

Clara were relegated from the championship following 0-15 to 0-14 defeat by Tullaroan.

Team changes

To Championship

Promoted from the Kilkenny Intermediate Hurling Championship
 Dicksboro

From Championship

Relegated to the Kilkenny Intermediate Hurling Championship
 St. Lachtain's

Results

First round

Relegation play-off

Quarter-finals

Semi-finals

Final

Championship statistics

Top scorers

Top scorers overall

Top scorers in a single game

External links
Kilkennygaa.ie

Kilkenny Senior Hurling Championship
Kilkenny